The Martini Professional Foursomes was a series of regional and national professional foursomes golf tournaments played in the England and Scotland between 1956 and 1960.

A Midland Professional Foursomes had been held between 1907 and 1939 but was not restarted after World War II. It was revived in 1956 as the Martini Midland Professional Foursomes. The event was a 36-hole stroke-play event, played in a single day. Players entered individually with the pairings randomly drawn. Total prize money was £300. David Snell and Charlie Ward won the event.

The Midland event continued in 1957 and a second event was added, the Martini Southern Professional Foursomes, held at Hill Barn Golf Club near Worthing. Both had prize money of £500. A third event was added in 1958, the Martini Northern Professional Foursomes, held at Pannal Golf Club near Harrogate. In 1959 four events were run, extended to cover all the PGA sections. A new event for the combined Scottish and Irish sections was held, while the Midland event was extended to include the Welsh and East Anglian sections and the Southern event was extended to include the West of England section.

In 1960 the same four regional tournaments were held but they also acted as qualifying events for a 72-hole national event which was held at The Berkshire club in late August, with prize money of £3,000. The tournaments were discontinued after 1960, Martini sponsoring a new event in 1961, the Martini International, with prize money of £6,000.

Winners

Midlands section
In 1959 and 1960 this included the Welsh and East Anglian sections

Southern section
In 1959 and 1960 this included the West of England section

Northern section

Scottish and Irish sections

National

References

Golf tournaments in England
Golf tournaments in Scotland